The 2006 Budapest Assembly election was held on 1 October 2006, concurring with other local elections in Hungary.

Mayor 

Incumbent Gábor Demszky was directly elected mayor with 46.86% of the vote against Fidesz–KDNP supported independent candidate István Tarlós.

Results 

List seats were distributed using the D'Hondt method.

Notes

References 

2006 in Hungary
2006 elections in Europe
Local elections in Hungary
History of Budapest